}}

The Olympic Games aired in the United States on the broadcast network ABC during the 1960s to the 1980s. ABC first televised the Winter Olympic Games in 1964, and the Summer Olympic Games in 1968. ABC last televised the Summer Olympics in 1984 and Winter Olympics in 1988.

History

1960s
While CBS aired both the 1960 Winter and Summer Games (marking the first time that the Olympics were broadcast on American television), by 1964, a different network showed the Winter Games: ABC. Roone Arledge won broadcast rights for his network and began a relationship with the "five rings" that would last over two decades. The program used many of the same production staff from ABC's Wide World of Sports, as well as the same host, Jim McKay, who moved to ABC from CBS in 1961. In 1968, ABC showed both the Winter Games and the Summer Games.

1964 Winter Olympics
The 1964 Winter Games were in Innsbruck, Austria, and coverage was taped and flown by plane back to the United States. All of it was in black-and-white, but with most Winter Olympic events in the morning (local time), most TV coverage aired the day the events were held. A portion of the Closing Ceremony was televised live via satellite (Telstar, which had to be tracked and allowed about a 15-minute window between the U.S. and Europe when it was zooming over the Atlantic). Everything else was videotaped and flown to the U.S. via a Munich-London-New York route. There was little margin for error. If a flight was canceled, ABC had a tape of a U.S.-Romania hockey game, played the day before the Opening Ceremony and shipped over, ready to play. All went well and it never made the air.

ABC aired 16.5 hours of coverage of the Innsbruck Games, the majority of the coverage occurring outside of primetime.

1968 Winter Olympics
By 1968, ABC was broadcasting the Olympics in full color, and satellites made possible live coverage of several events at the Winter Games in Grenoble, France and of nearly all of the network's coverage of the Summer Games in Mexico City. In reality, only the Opening Ceremony and the ladies figure skating final were televised live via satellite; most other coverage was sent via satellite to ABC and run off tape from New York. The 1968 Winter Olympics were the first to be televised in color (except for a couple of events the French fed in black-and-white).

Highlighting the 1968 Winter Games was a dramatic sweep in men's alpine skiing by Frenchman Jean-Claude Killy, while the major highlight of the Summer Games was a world-record long jump by Bob Beamon of the United States, which happened to air live in the US.

Coverage of the 1972 Munich massacre
In 1972, NBC showed the Winter Games from Sapporo, Japan, then ABC returned to carry the Summer Games in Munich, Germany. It was during the Summer Games that Palestinian terrorists attacked the Olympic Village and killed 11 Israeli athletes. Although Chris Schenkel was the actual host of the Games that year, Arledge assigned the story to McKay largely because he was a local news anchor in Baltimore, Maryland prior to joining CBS (and later ABC). McKay was joined on set by ABC news correspondent (and former and future evening news anchor) Peter Jennings, and coverage continued for many hours, until the outcome was known. Howard Cosell went with the film crew to get interviews in the village.

After an unsuccessful rescue attempt of the athletes held hostage, at 3:24 AM German Time, McKay came on the air with this statement:

McKay later won an Emmy Award for his coverage. He stated in a 2003 HBO documentary about his life and career that he was most proud of a telegram he received from Walter Cronkite the day after the massacre praising his work.

Keith Jackson was also involved in ABC's coverage of the 1972 Summer Olympics and continued to contribute even when the attack by Palestinian terrorists transformed the coverage from that of a typical sporting event to a greater international and historical news event. In all, he covered a total of 10 Summer and Winter Olympic Games. Jackson covered swimming at the 1972 Summer Olympics and track and field at the 1976 Summer Games. He covered speed-skating during the 1980 Winter Olympics featuring Eric Heiden. He was offered the position of play-by-play for hockey, but turned it down (the position ultimately went to Al Michaels). Jackson called speed skating and ski jumping at the 1984 Winter Olympics. He covered basketball in 1984. He was the weekend afternoon host for ABC's final Olympics in 1988 from Calgary.

1976–1988
By the time the 1976 edition came around, McKay was now installed at the host, a role he would play throughout the 1970s and '80s. ABC also aired the 1980 Winter Olympics.

In the 1976 Summer Games in Montreal, and the 1984 games in Los Angeles, Howard Cosell was the main voice for boxing. Sugar Ray Leonard won the gold medal in his light welterweight class at Montreal, beginning his meteoric rise to a world professional title three years later.  Cosell became close to Leonard, during this period, announcing many of his fights.

Chuck Mangione's instrumental song "Give It All You Got" was originally featured as the official theme of the 1980 Winter Olympics, held in Lake Placid, New York. ABC had used Mangione's recordings four years earlier during their coverage of the 1976 Summer Olympics, and then-ABC Sports president Roone Arledge asked the musician to create the theme song for the Winter games. Mangione also performed the song live at the Closing Ceremonies on February 24.

The 1980 Winter Olympics was the setting for the "Miracle on Ice", a medal-round men's ice hockey game in Lake Placid, New York, on February 22.  The United States team, made up of amateur and collegiate players and led by coach Herb Brooks, defeated the Soviet team, which consisted of veteran professional players with significant experience in international play. The rest of the United States (except those who watched the game live on Canadian television) had to wait to see the game, as ABC decided to broadcast the late-afternoon game on tape delay in prime time. Sportscaster Al Michaels, who was calling the game on ABC along with former Montreal Canadiens goalie Ken Dryden, picked up on the countdown in his broadcast, and delivered his famous call:

The Opening and Closing Ceremonies of the 1984 Summer Olympics, and 1988 Winter Olympics were hosted on ABC by Jim McKay and Peter Jennings.

ABC Sports also covered the 1984 Winter Olympics in Sarajevo, Yugoslavia, and the 1984 Summer Olympics in Los Angeles, USA. That year, Kathleen Sullivan became the first woman to serve as an in-anchor a telecast of the Olympic Games.

As previously mentioned, the 1988 Winter Olympics in Calgary, Alberta, Canada are the most recent Olympics to be covered by ABC Sports.

Since the 1988 Winter Games
After that, the network, at the insistence of new owner Capital Cities Communications (much to the chagrin of Roone Arledge's successor at ABC Sports, Dennis Swanson), opted not to bid for the rights to show any future Games. Subsequently, The Walt Disney Company acquired Capital Cities-ABC in 1995 and began the process of putting more effort into the branding of ABC's sports channel ESPN than of ABC Sports itself.

According to Al Michaels, ABC was in the running to purchase the broadcasting rights for the 1996 Summer Games from Atlanta. As a provision in his contract renewal with ABC back in 1992, in the event that ABC were to broadcast the Olympics again, Michaels would get to become the prime time anchor while Jim McKay would instead play an emeritus role. Ultimately though, NBC bought the rights to the Atlanta Games for $456 million, edging out ABC by $6 million.

In August 2008, ESPN, which produces sports broadcasts for ABC (branded as ESPN on ABC), stated that they would make a serious bid for the 2014 games in  Sochi, Russia and the 2016 games in Rio de Janeiro, Brazil. However, NBC won the rights to American television coverage of the Olympics through the 2020 Summer Games.

As of May 7, 2014, NBC now holds control of the Olympic television coverage in the United States through the 2032 Summer Games.

Hours of coverage

Commentators

Hosts

See also
NBC Olympic broadcasts
CBS Olympic broadcasts
Olympics on TNT
Olympics on television

Notes

References
ESPN.com : Search : olympics
ABC News: Wide World of Sports Index

The World Comes Together in Your Living Room: The Olympics on TV
ESPN/ABC wants the Olympics, promises NO tape-delayed coverage
InBaseline
1988 Winter Olympic Games
Logos of Olympic Broadcasters - Part 2: 1960s
Logos of Olympic Broadcasters - Part 3: 1970s
Logos of Olympic Broadcasters - Part 4: 1980s

Olympic broadcasts
American Broadcasting Company original programming
Black-and-white American television shows
ABC
1960s American television series
1970s American television series
1980s American television series
1964 American television series debuts
1988 American television series endings